Arnoldo Berruti (born 1902, date of death unknown) was an Italian water polo player. He competed in the men's tournament at the 1924 Summer Olympics.

References

External links
 

1902 births
Year of death missing
Italian male water polo players
Olympic water polo players of Italy
Water polo players at the 1924 Summer Olympics
Water polo players from Genoa